Stones Grow Her Name is the 7th full-length studio album by Finnish power metal band Sonata Arctica. It was released in Finland on May 16, 2012, in Europe on May 18, 2012, in North America on May 22, 2012 and in Japan on May 23, 2012. It was the last album to feature longtime bassist Marko Paasikoski.

In a 2014 interview about the album's successor Pariah's Child, vocalist and songwriter Tony Kakko referred to it as "a rock album [more] than anything else", comparing it to the more back-to-the roots sound of the 2014 band's release. Yet in a 2019 interview promoting the band's then new album Talviyö, Kakko said Stones Grow Her Name marked "some kind of maturity point for us", citing him becoming a father for the first time as an influence.

Song information
Regarding the song "Cinderblox", Kakko stated:

"Somewhere Close to You" was originally written for a possible solo release by Kakko, but ended up on the album. "Losing My Insanity" was originally written by Tony Kakko for Ari Koivunen's Fuel for the Fire. The final two tracks, "Wildfire, Part: II - One With the Mountain" and "Wildfire, Part: III - Wildfire Town, Population: 0" continue the story introduced in "Wildfire" from Reckoning Night.

Track list

Tour Edition
On October 24, 2012 a special 2 disc "Tour Edition" of the album was released in Japan to commemorate the band's appearance at the Loud Park Festival. The first disc contains the standard Japanese version of the album with "One-Two- Free-Fall" serving as the bonus track. The second disc features acoustic versions of "Only the Broken Hearts (Make You Beautiful)" "I Have a Right" "Alone In Heaven" and "Somewhere Close to You" respectively.

Personnel
Tony Kakko – vocals, additional keyboards
Elias Viljanen – guitars
Marko Paasikoski – bass
Henrik Klingenberg – keyboards
Tommy Portimo – drums

Guest artists 
 Mika Mylläri - trumpet on "Shitload of Money"
 Sakari Kukko - saxophone on "Shitload of Money"
 Peter Engberg - acoustic guitar, viola caipira and banjo on "I Have a Right", "Alone in Heaven", "The Day", "Don't Be Mean", "Cinderblox" and "Wildfire, Part:II - One with the Mountain"
 Timo Kotipelto - additional backing vocals on "Only the Broken Hearts (Make You Beautiful)", "Shitload of Money", "I Have a Right" and "Alone in Heaven"
 Lauri Valkonen - double bass at "Cinderblox" and "Wildfire, Part:II - One with the Mountain"
 Pekka Kuusisto - violin at "Don't Be Mean", "Cinderblox", "Wildfire, Part:II - One with the Mountain" and "Wildfire, Part:III - Wildfire Town, Population: 0"
 Anna Lavender - spoken parts on "I Have a Right"
 Mikko P. Mustonen - Orchestration on "Wildfire, Part:III - Wildfire Town, Population: 0"

Additional personnel 
 Masi Hukari - recording assistant and lyrics proofreader
 Nino Laurenne - producer
 Ahti Kortelainen - studio master technician
 Mikko Karmila - mixing
 Pelri Ahvenainen - recording engineer
 Ville - monitor technician
 Svante Forsbäck - mastering engineer

Charts

Certifications

References

Sonata Arctica albums
2012 albums
Nuclear Blast albums